The El Toro is an American pram sailboat that was designed by Charles McGregor as a sail training dinghy and yacht tender, first built in 1939. It is now often sailed as a singlehanded one-design racer.

The boat is a development of McGregor's Sabot design, the plans for which were published in The Rudder magazine in 1939. The design has been widely adapted and other derivations include the Naples Sabot, US Sabot, Wind'ard Sabot and the Australian Holdfast Trainer.

Production
The design was built by Moore Sailboats and W. D. Schock Corp in the United States, but it is now out of production. More than 11.000 boats were produced.

Design
The El Toro is a recreational sailing dinghy, with the early versions build of plywood and later ones of fiberglass, with wood trim. Spars may be made from wood, aluminum or carbon fiber. It has a cat rig, a squared stem, a nearly plumb transom, a transom-hung rudder controlled by a tiller and a retractable daggerboard. Ready to sail it displaces , with the hull alone weighing .

It can also be transported on a trailer or automobile roof.

Operational history
The boat is mostly sailed on the American west coast and is supported by an active class club that organizes racing events, the El Toro International Yacht Racing Association.

The class has competed in the annual BullShip Race in Sausalito, California, since 1954. The start line is at the Horizons Restaurant dock and the course runs to San Francisco, past Alcatraz Island and the Golden Gate Bridge, finishing at the end of the breakwater at the Golden Gate Yacht Club and St. Francis Yacht Club. Due to the distance, currents and other challenges for these small boats the race is referred to as The El Toro TransPac, a comparison to the Transpacific Yacht Race.

In a 2015 reviewer T. Sitzmann in Sail 1 Design wrote of the El Toro, that they "are satisfactory tenders and sprightly racers. Junior sailing programs at yacht clubs and municipal sailing classes have developed many fine young El Toro captains. High quality racing programs have kept the interest of these young sailors. Often sailors 'move up' to larger yachts and are frequently recognized as champions. Many return to the lively tactical sailing situations provided by El Toro racing."

See also
List of sailing boat types

Related development
Holdfast Trainer
Naples Sabot
Sabot (dinghy)
US Sabot

Similar sailboats
Optimist (dinghy)

References

External links

Dinghies
1930s sailboat type designs
One-design sailing classes
Sailboat type designs by Charles McGregor
Sailboat types built by Moore Sailboats
Sailboat types built by W. D. Schock Corp